Billy Bunter of Greyfriars School is a school story by Charles Hamilton writing as Frank Richards, using the characters and settings of the Greyfriars School stories published from 1908 to 1940 in The Magnet. The retail price was 5 shillings.

The novel was an immediate success, with sales of 25,000 copies within a few weeks. This was the maximum allowed during post-war paper shortages. The novel was reprinted by the original publisher in 1947, 1948 and 1950. Subsequently, it was republished by Armada in August 1968 and by Hawk in January 1991.

Origins
After the closure of The Magnet in May 1940 due to wartime paper shortages, author Charles Hamilton was contractually barred by the publisher, Amalgamated Press, from continuing to write Greyfriars stories. However in 1946 publisher Charles Skilton negotiated the rights to publish new stories in book form. Hamilton, delighted, suggested a payment rate of £90 per book; but Skilton, short of capital, asked Hamilton to accept royalties instead. This proved to be greatly in Hamilton's favour: he received £1,000 instead of £90 for the first book.

References 

1947 British novels
British children's novels
British comedy novels
Novels set in high schools and secondary schools
1947 children's books